An accession day is usually the anniversary of the date on which a monarch or executive takes office. The earliest records of accession celebrations date from the reign of Emperor Kanmu of Japan, and the custom is now observed in many nations.

Belgium
In Belgium there are local celebrations of the reigning monarch's accession, but the anniversary of the accession of the first king of modern Belgium, Leopold I, on 21 July 1831, is celebrated as a full national holiday, known as "Belgian National Day".

Indian subcontinent

Accession Day in India's Jammu and Kashmir commemorates the day in 1947 when the area joined the Dominion of India.
Accession Day is a state holiday in India's northernmost state, Jammu and Kashmir, commemorating 26 October 1947, when Maharaja Hari Singh signed off the Instrument of Accession, in which Jammu and Kashmir joined the Dominion of India. This was part of the series of events in 1947 by which rule the British Raj was converted into the two new independent Dominions of India and Pakistan, the latter having two territories separated by the whole of northern India. As a Hindu ruler of a state with both Hindu and Muslim subjects, the Maharaja's decision was crucial.

Festivities of the day include holding rallies, lighting firecrackers, singing India's national anthem, and raising the flag of India.

Morocco 

The accession of the Moroccan monarch is currently celebrated on 30 July, as that was the date when King Mohammed VI was enthroned, following the death of his father Hassan II on 23 July 1999. The date is marked with several official and civilian celebrations, in particular including a televised address given by Mohammed VI.

Netherlands

Koninginnedag (Queen's Day) was, during the reign of Queen Beatrix, celebrated on 30 April, the date of her accession in 1980 upon the abdication of her mother, Queen Juliana, whose birthday fell on 30 April). Beatrix abdicated on Koninginnedag 2013, which led to the accession of King Willem-Alexander. As a result, the holiday became known as Koningsdag (King's Day) from 2014 and the celebration was moved three days ahead to 27 April, to instead mark the birthday of Willem-Alexander.

United Arab Emirates
The United Arab Emirates is unusual in celebrating the accession of its president, although the president is elected from amongst the seven hereditary emirs (ruling princes) of the constituent states of the UAE, and is therefore also a hereditary and monarchical leader. Accession Day is a national holiday in the UAE.

United Kingdom 

The custom of marking this day was inaugurated during the reign of Queen Elizabeth I of England. Her accession day was celebrated in the United Kingdom and the Commonwealth during her reign and also, according to the 19th-century historian Thomas Lathbury, during the reigns of her successors. A "Form of Prayer and Thanksgiving" to be used in churches on the anniversary of the queen's accession was published in 1576 and used until 1602.

In 1568, the tenth anniversary of Queen Elizabeth's accession was marked with the ringing of bells and 17 November became known as "Queen Elizabeth's Day" or "Queene's Day". As her reign progressed, it was celebrated with increased fervour and, long after her death, it continued to be observed as a day of Protestant rejoicing and expression of anti-Catholic feeling. The observances included triumphal parades and processions, sermons against populism and the burning of the Pope in effigy. After the Great Fire of London (1666), "these rejoicings were converted into a satirical saturnalia of the most turbulent kind"; the greatest excesses occurred in the years 1679–81 when wealthy members of political clubs paid for processions and bonfires to arouse the populace to political fervour. The inhabitants of Berry Pomeroy in south Devon reinstated the tradition of Queene's Day in 2005 with a special church service and bonfire.

On the accession of King James I of England, a form of prayer and thanksgiving was issued for use in all churches "upon his entry to this kingdom". In 1625, a new service was issued which was sanctioned by Convocation in 1640 but set aside by Parliament at the Restoration when certain parts of it were included in the special service for 29 May. When King James II acceded the throne, he ordered the preparation of a special form of prayer and thanksgiving for the anniversary of his accession day and a revised version of the old service was prepared and set forth by authority in 1685. The form of words "the day on which His Majesty began his happy reign" was first used in this service and has been retained ever since. After falling out of use during the reigns of William III and Mary II, the service was revised and used again during the reign of Queen Anne. King George V's accession day (reigned 1910–36) was 6 May. From 1952 until 2022, Accession Day took place on 6 February, during the reign of Elizabeth II.

The present monarch, Charles III's, accession day is 8 September. Accession day is observed in the United Kingdom by the flying of specific flags and various official functions. In London, a Royal Salute is fired by the guns of the King's Troop, Royal Horse Artillery in Green Park and by the Honourable Artillery Company at the Tower of London. Salutes are also fired at Woolwich, Colchester, Edinburgh Castle, Stirling Castle, Cardiff, Belfast, York, Portsmouth, Plymouth and Dover Castle.

Special services are required by canon in all cathedrals, churches, and chapels of the Church of England. The Book of Common Prayer provides options for a stand-alone Accession Day service, or for special propers by which any or all of the services of Matins, Evensong and Holy Communion may be altered for the day. The Church's more recent prayer book Common Worship does not provide a full form of service, but refers the user to the Book of Common Prayer; it does, however, provide propers for the Eucharist on Accession Day. Although not a legal requirement, special services are also held in some churches of other denominations.  Divine Worship: The Missal provides the following Collect for use at Masses, Mattins, and Evensong in the Catholic Personal Ordinariate of Our Lady of Walsingham:

Vatican City 
The Vatican counts the Anniversario dell'Elezione del Santo Padre, or the anniversary of the election of the reigning pontiff, among its statutory public holidays. Since 2014, the city-state has observed this holiday on 13 March, the anniversary of Pope Francis' election in 2013.

See also
 Accession Council
 Accession Day tilt
 National day

Citations

Anniversaries
Religious festivals
English monarchs
Access
Observances